Rhyno Janse van Rensburg (born 16 December 1991) is a South African cricketer. He is a right-handed batsman and right-arm medium-pace bowler who plays for Griqualand West.  He was born in Kimberley.

Van Rensburg made his cricketing debut for Griqualand West Under-19s during the CSA Under-19 competition during the 2008-09 season, taking the wicket of Nashen Govender early in the match, and scoring a half century.

He made his first-class debut for the side during the 2009-10 season, against Boland.

References

1991 births
Living people
South African cricketers
Griqualand West cricketers